The Department of the Interior and Local Government, abbreviated as DILG, is the executive department of the Philippine government responsible for promoting peace and order, ensuring public safety and strengthening local government capability aimed towards the effective delivery of basic services to the citizenry. 

The department is currently led by the secretary of the interior and local government, nominated by the president of the Philippines and confirmed by the Commission on Appointments. The secretary is a member of the Cabinet. The current secretary of the interior and local government is Sec. Benjamin Abalos Jr.

History
The DILG traces its roots in the Tejeros Convention of March 22, 1897. As the Department of the Interior, it was among the first Cabinet positions of the proposed revolutionary Philippine government, wherein Gen. Emilio Aguinaldo was elected president. The leader of Katipunan's Magdiwang faction, Andres Bonifacio, was originally elected director of the interior in the convention, but a controversial objection to his election led to the Magdiwang's walk-out and his refusal to accept the position. Gen. Pascual Alvarez would be appointed as secretary by Aguinaldo on April 17, 1897, during the Naic Assembly.

The Department of the Interior was officially enshrined on November 1, 1897, upon the promulgation of the Biak-na-Bato Republic, with Isabelo Artacho as secretary. Article XV of the Biak-na-Bato Constitution defined the powers and functions of the department that included statistics, roads and bridges, agriculture, public information and posts, and public order.

Following the American occupation in 1901, the Department of the Interior was among the four departments created by virtue of Philippine Commission Act No. 222.  Americans headed the department until 1917, when Rafael Palma was appointed by Governor-General Francis Harrison following the passage of the Jones Law. The Interior Department was tasked with various functions ranging from supervision over local units, forest conservation, public instructions, control and supervision over the police, counter-insurgency, rehabilitation, community development and cooperatives development programs.

At the onset of World War II, Pres. Manuel L. Quezon abolished the department via Executive Order 390. It was resurrected as part of the Philippine Executive Commission in 1942 under the Japanese Occupation, but abolished once again the following year, upon the establishment of the Second Philippine Republic. Its secretary before the abolition, Jose P. Laurel, was elected as Philippine president by the National Assembly.

The department was reinstated by Pres. Sergio Osmeña months after the country's liberation from Japanese forces in December 1944. It was then merged with the Department of National Defense in July 1945. Pres. Manuel Roxas' Executive Order No. 94 in 1947 split the Department of National Defense and the Interior, and tasked the newly reorganized Interior Department to supervise the administration of the Philippine Constabulary and all local political subdivisions, among others.

A 1950 reorganization via Executive Order No. 383 (in pursuance of Republic Act 422) abolished the Interior Department once again. Its functions were transferred to the Office of Local Government (later the Local Government and Civil Affairs Office) under the Office of the President.

On January 6, 1956, under Pres. Ramon Magsaysay, the Presidential Assistant on Community Development (PACD) office was created via Executive Order No. 156, with functions resembling that of the Interior Department sans supervision over the police force. It was renamed the Presidential Arm on Community Development in 1966.

The department was restored on November 7, 1972, with the creation of the Department of Local Government and Community Development (DLGCD). The DLGCD was reorganized as a ministry in the parliamentary Batasang Pambansa in 1978, renamed the Ministry of Local Government in 1982, and became the Department of Local Government (DLG) in 1987.

On December 13, 1990, Republic Act 6975 placed the Philippine National Police, Bureau of Fire Protection, Bureau of Jail Management and Penology and the Philippine Public Safety College under the reorganized Department of the Interior and Local Government (DILG).  The new DILG merged the National Police Commission (NAPOLCOM), and all the bureaus, offices, and operating units of the former DLG under Executive Order No. 262.  RA 6975 paved the way for the union of the local governments and the police force after nearly four decades of separation.

List of secretaries of the interior and local government

Organizational structure
At present, the department is headed by the secretary of the interior and local government, with the following undersecretaries and assistant secretaries:
Undersecretary for Barangay Affairs
Undersecretary for Local Government
Undersecretary for Mindanao Affairs and Special Concerns
Undersecretary for Operations
Undersecretary for Peace and Order
Undersecretary for Plans, Public Affairs and Communications
Undersecretary for Public Safety
Assistant Secretary for Administration, Finance and Comptrollership
Assistant Secretary for Community Participation and Barangay Affairs
Assistant Secretary for Human Resources Development
Assistant Secretary for Internal Relations and Other Interior Sector Concerns
Assistant Secretary for Peace and Order
Assistant Secretary for Plans and Programs
Assistant Secretary for Special Concerns-Local Government Sector
Assistant Secretary for Public Safety and Security

Under the Office of the Secretary are the following offices and services:
 Administrative Service
Central Office Disaster Information Coordinating Center (CODIX)
Emergency 911 National Office
Financial Management Service
 Information Systems and Technology Management Service
 Internal Audit Service
 Legal and Legislative Liaison Service
 Planning Service
Public Affairs and Communication Service
 Public Assistance and Complaint Center

A regional director is assigned to each of the 18 regions of the Philippines.

Bureaus
The DILG is composed of three bureaus, namely:
 Bureau of Local Government Development (BLGD)
 Bureau of Local Government Supervision (BLGS)
 National Barangay Operations Office (NBOO)
 Office of Project Development Services (OPDS)

Leagues
Recognized Leagues under the DILG:
Barangay Councilors' League of the Philippines
Lady Local Legislators' League of the Philippines
League of Cities of the Philippines
League of Municipalities of the Philippines
League of Provinces of the Philippines
League of Vice Governors of the Philippines
Liga ng mga Barangay sa Pilipinas/Association of Barangay Captains
Metro Manila Councilors' League
National Movement of Young Legislators
Philippine Councilors' League
Provincial Board Members' League of the Philippines
Sangguniang Kabataan National Federation
Union of Local Authorities of the Philippines
Vice Mayors' League of the Philippines

Attached agencies
The following are attached to the DILG:
 Bureau of Fire Protection
 Bureau of Jail Management and Penology
 Local Government Academy 
National Commission on Muslim Filipinos
 National Police Commission
National Youth Commission
Philippine Commission on Women
 Philippine National Police 
 Philippine Public Safety College

References

 
Philippines
Law enforcement in the Philippines
Philippines, Interior and Local Government
Interior and Local Government
Local government ministries